Idol School is a South Korean variety show, which aired on  MBC Music, MBC's cable and satellite network for music. The show is hosted by Jun Hyun-moo, singer Kim Yeon-woo and Sojin of Girl's Day.

Corners/Segments

 "Manager's Fast Pedal" –  Manager of team are turning the pedals. The music filled the team's fastest energy is playing. However, any amount determined by the ability of the manager.
 "Profile Talk" – The hosts feature the profile, info, facts, and rumors about the guest. The idols need to verify, or even, voluntarily prove the info before the MCs. That must appeal to charm in a short period of time. If guest winner the guest get transition stage, stage video and special effects. This is not something you want, when penalties drastically manager.
 "Survival Game" – The guests play a game together with the hosts make a group. If the guest winner will get 10 cameras and show stage, if lost will get 1 camera and pin stage.
 "Survival Show" – A special where the guests have result survival and make a group for performance stage.

Hosts

Current hosts

Jun Hyun-moo 
Kim Yeon-woo 
Sojin

List of Episodes

2014

References

External links
 MBC Music "Idol School" homepage 

South Korean variety television shows
MBC TV original programming
2014 South Korean television series debuts